Clayton Public Schools form a comprehensive community public school district that serves students in pre-kindergarten through twelfth grade from the town of Clayton, in Gloucester County, New Jersey, United States.

As of the 2020–21 school year, the district, comprised of three schools, had an enrollment of 1,463 students and 117.0 classroom teachers (on an FTE basis), for a student–teacher ratio of 12.5:1.

Clayton Public Schools are classified by the New Jersey Department of Education as being in District Factor Group "CD", the sixth-highest of eight groupings. District Factor Groups organize districts statewide to allow comparison by common socioeconomic characteristics of the local districts. From lowest socioeconomic status to highest, the categories are A, B, CD, DE, FG, GH, I and J.

Clayton Public Schools provides a variety of opportunities for students in academics, co-curricular activities, athletics, communications, technology, fine and performing arts, and school-based student services. Through the Safe Schools/Healthy Students (SS/HS) Grant Initiative, Clayton Schools offers counseling and assistance to students and families by providing an on-site counseling center located in the Herma Simmons Elementary School. The District also offers a School-Based Youth Services Program (SBYSP), Clayton Place, which is housed in its high school/middle school, to provide counseling, tutoring, and recreation activities for students at the secondary level.  In addition to a very active and dedicated Home and School Association, Clayton School District has developed strong partnerships with local constituents and recognizes those relationships as vital to its success.

Schools
Schools in the district (with 2020–21 enrollment data from the National Center for Education Statistics) are:
Elementary school
Herma S. Simmons Elementary School with 668 students in grades PreK-5
Scott G. Uribe, Principal
Middle school
Clayton Middle School with 343 students in grades 6-8
Marvin Tucker, Principal
High School
Clayton High School with 420 students in grades 9-12
Joseph Visalli, Principal

Administration
Core members of Clayton School District's administration are:
Nikolaos Koutsogiannis, Superintendent
Fran Adler, Business Administrator / Board Secretary

Board of education
The district's board of education is comprised of nine members who set policy and oversee the fiscal and educational operation of the district through its administration. As a Type II school district, the board's trustees are elected directly by voters to serve three-year terms of office on a staggered basis, with three seats up for election each year held (since 2012) as part of the November general election. The board appoints a superintendent to oversee the district's day-to-day operations and a business administrator to supervise the business functions of the district.

References

External links
Clayton Public Schools

School Data for the Clayton Public Schools, National Center for Education Statistics
Clayton High School receives second bronze medal from USNews and World Report

Clayton, New Jersey
New Jersey District Factor Group CD
School districts in Gloucester County, New Jersey